Ibrahim ibn Sinan (Arabic: Ibrāhīm ibn Sinān ibn Thābit ibn Qurra, ; born 295296 AH/ in Baghdad, died: 334-335 AH/946 in Baghdad, aged 38) was a mathematician and astronomer who belonged to a family of scholars originally from Harran in northern Mesopotamia. He was the son of Sinan ibn Thabit (943) and the grandson of Thābit ibn Qurra (901). Like his grandfather, he belonged to a religious sect of star worshippers known as the Sabians of Harran.

Ibrahim ibn Sinan studied geometry, in particular tangents to circles. He made advances in the quadrature of the parabola and the theory of integration, generalizing the work of Archimedes, which was unavailable at the time. Ibrahim ibn Sinan is often considered to be one of the most important mathematicians of his time.

Notes

Sources
 
  (PDF version)

Further reading
  Reviews: Seyyed Hossein Nasr (1998) in Isis 89 (1) pp. 112-113; Charles Burnett (1998) in Bulletin of the School of Oriental and African Studies, University of London 61 (2) p. 406.
 

900s births
946 deaths
Year of birth uncertain
10th-century Arabs
10th-century people from the Abbasid Caliphate
10th-century mathematicians
10th-century astronomers
Geometers
People from Baghdad
Mathematicians from the Abbasid Caliphate
Astronomers from the Abbasid Caliphate
Astronomers of the medieval Islamic world
Sabian scholars from the Abbasid Caliphate